Duk is a county in Jonglei, South Sudan. In May 2016, it was divided into 3 counties which were Duk Padiet, Duk Payuel and Panyang.

In 2017 governor of Jonglei State once call Duk Pagaak county, this make total counties Four in Duk

References

Counties of Jonglei State